Lori FC was an Armenian football club based in Vanadzor, Lori Province. Originally founded in 1936, Lori has participated in the domestic football competition of Soviet Armenia. After retiring from professional football in 2002, the club was revived in 2017 winning the 2017–18 Armenian First League competition.

History
The club participated in the first ever Armenian football competition after the split-up from the Soviet Union. After the regular competition, they did not qualify for the championship stage, but were forced to play in the relegation stage. Here they finished in the seventh position, which forced them to play in the Armenian First League (second level) for the 1993 season. In that season they finished first in their group (the league was split up into two groups) which gave them promotion to the Armenian Premier League. Lori then became a yo-yo team referring to their up-and-go history of promotion and relegation. In 2002 they played their last season in the Premier League before being disbanded. 

The reestablishment of Lori FC was officially announced on 2 March 2017, by Tovmas Grigoryan; a native businessman of the city of Vanadzor. The club made its debut at professional football through the 2017–18 Armenian First League competition.

The club used the Vanadzor Football Academy as their training ground. The academy was temporarily being used as a home ground for their official matches in the Armenian First League competition, as the Vanadzor City Stadium was (currently) being reconstructed and set to be ready during summer 2019.

On 18 June 2019, David Campaña Piquer was appointed as the new manager of Lori on a contract until the summer of 2020. On 2 June 2020, Lori announced that manager David Campaña and his assistants Francisco Compan, Jorge Gomez, Agustin Perez and Enrique Gil had all left the club as their contracts could not be extended due to travel restrictions in returning to Armenia due to the COVID-19 pandemic. Later the same day, Armen Sanamyan was announced as Lori's caretaker manager.
On 4 August 2020, Armen Sanamyan left Lori to become manager of Sevan, with Lori announcing Albert Solomonov as their new manager on 5 August 2020, with Solomonov signing a one-year contract.

Following a disagreement with the administrative decision to awarded FC Urartu a 3-0 victory over Lori due to Lori being unable to field a team for their match due to COVID-19, Lori walked off at the start of their match against Ararat Yerevan on 16 March 2021. Lori later submitted their resignation from the Premier League on 5 April 2021.

League and cup
Lori FC league record since 1987:

Last Squad

Personnel
Owner:  Tovmas Grigoryan
President:  Robert Grigoryan
Vice President:  Vahan Danielyan
CEO:  Artur Hovhannisyan
General Manager:  Spartak Petrosyan
Head coach:  Albert Solomonov
Assistant coach:  Vitaliy Starovik
Assistant coach:  Sergei Chikishev
Goalkeepers Coach:  Slavik Sukiasyan
Fitness coach:  Roman Chupryna
Doctor:  Hovsep Petrosyan
Physiotherapist: Arshak Tumanyan

Former players

  Danny El-Hage

Managerial history
Managers of Lori FC since the club revived in 2017:

References

 
Football clubs in Armenia
Sport in Vanadzor
Association football clubs established in 1936
1936 establishments in Armenia